A miniature horse is a breed or type of horse characterised by its small size. Although such horses have the appearance of small horses, they are genetically much more similar to pony breeds such as the Shetland. They have various colors and coat patterns.

Miniature horses are present in several countries, including Argentina, Australia, France, Germany, Holland, Ireland, Namibia, the Philippines, the United Kingdom and the United States.

They are commonly kept as companion animals. Some are trained as service animals, and others for sporting activities such as driving and other competitive horse show events.

History

Miniature horses originated in Europe, where there is written and iconographic documentation of them from the late eighteenth century. In the first half of the twentieth century small horses were bred in England by Lady Estella Mary Hope and her sister Lady Dorothea.

The Falabella was developed in Argentina in the 1868 by Patrick Newtall. When Newtall died, the herd and breeding methods were passed to Newtall's son-in-law, Juan Falabella. Juan added additional bloodlines including the Welsh Pony, Shetland pony, and small Thoroughbreds. With considerable inbreeding he was able to gain consistently small size within the herd.

The South African Miniature Horse was developed in South Africa and has a wide range of conformations represented in its population. Some resemble miniature Arabians, while others appear to be scaled-down versions of draft horses. Wynand de Wet was the first breeder of miniature horses in South Africa, beginning his program in 1945 in Lindley, South Africa. Other breeders soon followed, with many using Arabian horses in their breeding programs. In 1984, a breed registry was begun, and the national livestock association recognized the South African Miniature Horse as an independent breed in 1989. There are approximately 700 miniature horses registered in South Africa.

Characteristics 

Miniature horses are generally quite hardy, often living longer on average than some full-sized horse breeds; the usual life span is from 40 to 45 years. 

Their pre-disposition to disease is markedly different from that of full-sized horses. They are only rarely affected by ailments such as laryngeal hemiplegia, osteochondrosis or navicular disease, all of which are common in larger horses, but are much more likely to develop other illnesses rare in large horses, such as hyperlipaemia – which may lead to hepatic lipidosis – or eclampsia. Dental misalignment and overcrowding are more common than in larger horses: brachygnathism ('parrot mouth') and prognathism ('sow mouth') are often seen; retention of caps can occur, as can infection of the sinuses associated with tooth eruption. Poor mastication can contribute to an increased incidence of colic caused by enteroliths, faecoliths, or sand.

Use 

Miniature horses are commonly kept as companion animals. They are often too small for any but the smallest riders to ride. They may participate in events such as halter (horse conformation), in-hand hunter and jumper, driving, liberty, costume, obstacle or trail classes, and showmanship. A small number have been trained as guide horses for blind people; some people, particularly from Muslim cultures, may consider dogs unclean but accept horses.

See also
 Miniature cattle

References

Further reading

 R.L. Blakely (March 1985). Miniature Horses. National Geographic 167 (3): 384–393. .

Horse breeds
Types of horse